Sue Island is a town in the locality of Warraber Islet in the Torres Strait Island Region, Queensland, Australia.

Geography 
The town is on the north-western part of Warraber Islet.

References 

Torres Strait Island Region
Towns in Queensland